Mark Lloyd Ericks (born July 24, 1951) is a retired United States Marshal and former Washington State Representative.

References

1951 births
United States Marshals
American police chiefs
Democratic Party members of the Washington House of Representatives
Living people